The 1981 UK Championship (also known as the 1981 Coral UK Championship for sponsorship reasons) was a professional non-ranking snooker tournament that took place at the Guild Hall in Preston, England, between 22 November and 5 December 1981. This was the fifth edition of the UK Championship, the fourth staging of the competition in Preston, and the fourth consecutive UK Championship to be sponsored by Coral. The televised stages were shown on the BBC from 28 November through to the end of the championship.

Tournament summary
 Steve Davis retained the first of his major titles by defeating Terry Griffiths 16–3 in the final.
 Jimmy White, fresh from his success in the Langs Scottish Masters and Northern Ireland Classic, which took place earlier in the season, beat Clive Everton, John Virgo, Dennis Taylor and Ray Reardon, in reaching the semi-finals at his first attempt, but then was whitewashed 0–9 by the reigning World and UK Champion Steve Davis.
 Two other young players, Tony Knowles and Tony Meo, also enhanced their reputations: Knowles by beating Fred Davis and Doug Mountjoy in reaching the quarter-finals, and Meo by defeating Rex Williams, Cliff Thorburn and Alex Higgins in reaching the semi-finals.

Main draw

Final

Qualifying

Best of 17 frames

Century breaks

 131  Terry Griffiths
 126  Willie Thorne
 120, 105  Steve Davis
 120  Alex Higgins
 120  Kirk Stevens
 107  Tony Meo
 103  Rex Williams
 102  Tony Knowles

References

UK Championship (snooker)
UK Championship
UK Championship
UK Championship
UK Championship